The Maryland Cycling Classic is a one-day road cycling race in the state of Maryland. The inaugural race was September 4, 2022. The category 1.Pro race is a part of the UCI America Tour and the UCI ProSeries calendars.

History 
The race was originally scheduled for September 6, 2020. However, due to the COVID-19 pandemic, the race was first postponed to 2021 and then again to 2022.

The 194 km/120.4 mile route starts in northern Baltimore County and ends in downtown Baltimore. The race begins with riders navigating the rolling terrain of rural northern Baltimore County while the final, flatter laps loop through Baltimore City, ending at the Inner Harbor.  

The race is the only one-day race in the United States part of the UCI ProSeries and with the UCI World Tour Tour of California going on hiatus in 2020, it is the highest stature one-day race in the country.  This makes the Maryland Cycling Classic the highest level road cycling race in the United States (highest level one-day and tied with overall highest level with the Tour of Utah.)

The winner of the inaugural Maryland Cycling Classic on Sunday, September 4, 2022 was Sep Vanmarcke of Belgium riding for Israel-Premier Tech with a time of 4:34:45. Nickolas Zukowsky of Canada riding for Human Powered Health and Neilson Powless of the United States riding for EF Education-EasyPost rounded out the top three.

According to race director Terry Hasseltine, the plan for the Maryland Cycling Classic "is to convince the UCI to allow the Maryland Cycling Classic to add a women’s race next year [2023] and then another day of racing to the 2024 version."

Winners

{{Cycling pw no race|year=2021|reason=COVID-19 pandemic}}

Multiple winnersRiders in italics are active.''

Wins per country

References

External links

Cycle races in the United States
Recurring sporting events established in 2020
Men's road bicycle races
UCI America Tour races
UCI ProSeries